Eram Rural District is in Eram District of Dashtestan County, Bushehr province, Iran. At the census of 2006, its population was 6,116 in 1,217 households; there were 5,120 inhabitants in 1,245 households at the following census of 2011; and in the most recent census of 2016, the population of the rural district was 5,045 in 1,394 households. The largest of its 22 villages was Rud-e Faryab, with 1,917 people.

References 

Rural Districts of Bushehr Province
Populated places in Dashtestan County